Wen Hsing-tsun (16 November 1926 – 14 July 2012) was a Taiwanese educator and politician who served in the Legislative Yuan from 1987 to 1990.

Born in 1926 to Hakka parents in Japanese-era Taiwan, Wen was raised what became Gaoshu, Pingtung County. He founded and led schools in the counties of Kaohsiung and Pingtung. For his contributions to education in Taiwan, Wen was appointed to the Legislative Yuan in 1987. Upon the end of his term in 1990, Wen became president of Meiho University. He was later named a senior adviser to Presidents Lee Teng-hui and Ma Ying-jeou. He died of pancreatic cancer at his home in Pingtung County in 2012, aged 86.

References

1926 births
2012 deaths
Taiwanese politicians of Hakka descent
Kuomintang Members of the Legislative Yuan in Taiwan
Members of the 1st Legislative Yuan in Taiwan
Presidents of universities and colleges in Taiwan
Politicians of the Republic of China on Taiwan from Pingtung County
Deaths from cancer in Taiwan
Deaths from pancreatic cancer
Senior Advisors to President Lee Teng-hui
Senior Advisors to President Ma Ying-jeou
Taiwanese schoolteachers
20th-century Taiwanese educators